Oxo was a British thoroughbred racehorse noted for winning the 1959 Grand National.

Oxo was a bay gelding bred in Dorset by A. C. Wyatt. An eight-year-old owned by Mr Jack Biggs and trained by Willie Stephenson in Royston, Hertfordshire, Oxo was ridden in the National by Michael Scudamore.  Starting as the second favourite at 8/1, Oxo fought it out for the lead with Wyndburgh, only winning after fighting all the way to the finish, by a length and a half.

References

Racehorses bred in the United Kingdom
Racehorses trained in the United Kingdom
Grand National winners
Thoroughbred family 11-a
National Hunt racehorses
1951 racehorse births